Isaiah Afamefuna Ekejiuba [Eck-ah-ju-buh] (born October 5, 1981) is a former Nigerian-American linebacker of American football. He was originally signed by the Arizona Cardinals as an undrafted free agent in 2005. He played college football at Virginia.

Ekejiuba has also played for the Oakland Raiders and the Detroit Lions of the National Football League.

Early years
Ekejiuba was born in Nigeria and lived throughout parts of Africa, China and London while his mother worked for the United Nations, before moving to upstate New York where his mother taught at Colgate University.
Ekejiuba attended high school at Suffield Academy, a boarding school in Connecticut. At Suffield, Ekejiuba played football his senior year and excelled in soccer, basketball and track.

College career
In 2002, Ekejiuba joined the Virginia Cavaliers in the NCAA.

Ekejiuba was on the Virginia football roster in the 2002 season as a wide receiver, but did not play in the whole season.

Prior to the 2003 season, he switched his position to linebacker. Leading the special teams, Ekejiuba was awarded a scholarship prior to the start of the season. He played on the punt, punt return, kickoff and kickoff return units.

Statistics

Professional career

Arizona Cardinals
After going undrafted in the 2005 NFL Draft, Ekejiuba signed with the Arizona Cardinals. He spent training camp with the team but was released before the regular season.

Oakland Raiders
On September 6, 2005, Ekejiuba was signed to the practice squad of the Oakland Raiders. He spent the first seven weeks of the season there before being promoted to the active roster on October 28.

A restricted free agent in the 2008 offseason, Ekejiuba was tendered a one-year contract by the Raiders. He was re-signed on April 14.

Ekejiuba was a 3rd alternate for the 2009 Pro Bowl on special teams.

On July 8, 2010 Ekejiuba was released.

Detroit Lions
Ekejiuba signed with the Detroit Lions on July 23, 2010.

Career statistics

Personal life
The son of the late Felicia Ekejiuba, Ekejiuba has two brothers, Ben Umezurike and Sam Ekejiuba, and two sisters, Ada Umezurike and Felicia Ekejiuba. At the University of Virginia, he majored in electrical engineering.

References

External links

 Oakland Raiders bio
 Virginia Cavaliers bio

1981 births
Living people
Players of American football from Connecticut
Players of American football from New York (state)
African-American players of American football
Nigerian emigrants to the United States
Nigerian players of American football
American football linebackers
Virginia Cavaliers football players
Arizona Cardinals players
Oakland Raiders players
Detroit Lions players
21st-century African-American sportspeople
20th-century African-American people